The 2010 Antonio Savoldi–Marco Cò – Trofeo Dimmidisì was a professional tennis tournament played on outdoor clay courts. It was the twelfth edition of the tournament which is part of the 2010 ATP Challenger Tour. It took place in Manerbio, Italy between 23 and 29 August 2010.

ATP entrants

Seeds

 Rankings are as of August 16, 2010.

Other entrants
The following players received wildcards into the singles main draw:
  Francesco Aldi
  Alberto Brizzi
  Matteo Trevisan
  Filippo Volandri

The following players received entry from the qualifying draw:
  Marco Crugnola
  Adrián García
  Marc Sieber
  Marcel Zimmermann

Champions

Singles

 Robin Haase def.  Marco Crugnola, 6–3, 6–2.

Doubles

 Robin Haase /  Thomas Schoorel vs  Diego Junqueira /  Gabriel Trujillo-Soler, 6–4, 6–4

External links
Official Site
ITF Search 

Antonio Savoldi-Marco Co - Trofeo Dimmidisi
Antonio Savoldi–Marco Cò – Trofeo Dimmidisì
2010 in Italian tennis